Lunsford may refer to:

People
Thomas Lunsford (ca. 1611–1656), Royalist colonel in the English Civil War
Bascom Lamar Lunsford (1882–1973), American lawyer, folklorist and musician
Earl Lunsford (1933–2008), Canadian football player
Andrea Lunsford, American writer and scholar
Darrell Lunsford (1943–1991), murdered American police officer
Bruce Lunsford (born 1947), American politician
Mel Lunsford (born 1950), American football player
Dale A. Lunsford, sixth president of LeTourneau University
Bret Lunsford (born 1962), American musician
Mike Lunsford, American chief executive
Matt Lunsford, American founder and co-owner of Polyvinyl Record Co.
Trey Lunsford (born 1979), American baseball player
Jennifer Lunsford (born 1982), American politician
Stephen Lunsford (born 1989), American actor

Homicides
Murder of Jessica Lunsford
Murder of Darrell Lunsford

Places
Lunsford, an area of Larkfield, Kent, England, also known as Lunsford Park